is a Japanese television drama  series and the 100th Memorial Asadora series, following Manpuku. It premiered on April 1, 2019, and concluded on September 28, 2019. The story is loosely based on the life of animator Reiko Okuyama.

Plot
As Natsu's parents were dead, she was raised by her father's old friend Takeo Shibata in Tokachi Hokkaido. At first Natsu was not recognized as a member of the Shibata family, but gradually gains Taijū Shibata's trust by her efforts. Natsu learns a lot from him and he has a great influence on her life.

But Natsu decides to go to Tokyo to be an animator.

Cast

Natsu's family 

 Suzu Hirose as Natsu Okuhara (based on Reiko Okuyama)
 Sari Awano as young Natsu
 Masaki Okada as Saitarō Okuhara, Natsu's brother
 Ao Watanabe as young Saitarō
 Kaya Kiyohara as Chiharu Okuhara, Natsu's sister
 Noa Tanaka as young Chiharu
Naho Toda as Natsu's mother (cameo)
Teruyoshi Uchimura as Natsu's father (cameo)

Hokkaido and Tokachi people

Shibata ranch 

 Masao Kusakari as Taijū Shibata, Shibata Ranch owner
 Nanako Matsushima as Fujiko Shibata, Natsu's foster mother
 Naohito Fujiki as Takeo Shibata, Natsu's foster father
 Shō Kiyohara as Teruo Shibata, Takeo's son
 Ryōtarō Okajima as young Teruo
 Momoko Fukuchi as Yumiko Shibata, Teruo's eldest daughter
 Rian Arakawa as young Yumiko
 Nanaka Hirao as Akemi Shibata, Teruo's youngest daughter
 Moeka Yoshida as young Akemi
 Takashi Kobayashi as Yūkichi Tomura, Shibata Ranch's employee
 Takuma Oto'o (TEAM-NACS) as Kikusuke Tomura, Yūkichi's son

Setsugetsu pastry shop 

 Ken Yasuda (TEAM-NACS) as Yukinosuke Obata, the pastry's shopkeeper
 Atsuko Takahata as Toyo Obata, Yukinosuke's mother
 Nobuko Sendō as Taeko Obata, Yukinosuke's wife
 Yūki Yamada as Yukijirō Obata, Yukinosuke and Taeko's son

Yamada family 
 Ryo Yoshizawa as Ten'yō Yamada, Natsu's friend (based on Kanda Nissho)
 Shigeyuki Totsugi (TEAM-NACS) as Seiji Yamada, Ten'yō's father
 Ayako Kobayashi as Tami Yamada, Ten'yō's mother
 Sakurako Ohara as Yasue Yamada, Ten'yō's wife
 Atsuhiro Inukai as Yōhei Yamada, Ten'yō's brother

Tōyō Animation
Shihori Kanjiya as Mako Ōsawa
Arata Iura as Tsutomu Naka (based on Yasuji Mori)
Shōta Sometani as Kōya Kamiji (based on Hayao Miyazaki)
Taishi Nakagawa as Kazuhisa Sakaba (based on Isao Takahata), Natsu's husband
Akira Kawashima (Kirin) as Katsumi Shimoyama
Mayu Watanabe as Akane Mimura
Houka Kinoshita as Shigehiko Tsuyuki
Rikka Ihara as Momoyo Morita
Shinya Kote as Noboru Idohara
Takuzō Kadono as Mitsuru Ōsugi (based on Hiroshi Ōkawa)

Others 
Takeo Nakahara as Yaichirō Agawa
Kie Kitano as Sara Agawa, Yoichirō's daughter
Miu Tomita as Yoshiko Imura, Natsu's classmate
Tasuku Emoto as Ryūichi Kurata, Natsu's high school teacher
Manami Higa as Kōko Maejima
Hiromi Iwasaki (cameo)
Sanae Kitabayashi (cameo)
Tomoko Yamaguchi as Ayami Kishikawa
Kōichi Yamadera as Yūsei Toyotomi (based on Hisaya Morishige)
Anju Suzuki as Ranko Kameyama (based on Mariko Miyagi)
Hideko Hara as Nahoko Mitsuyama
Hiroyuki Morisaki (TEAM-NACS) as Hiroshi Ōshimizu
Kaho Mizutani as Sachiko Mihashi
Tsutomu Sekine as Kazunao Sakaba, Kazuhisa's father
Mihoko Fujita as Sato Sakaba, Kazuhisa's mother
Mana Mikura as Michiko Sasaoka
Yūko Tanaka as Dr. Takahashi (cameo)
Ema Fujisawa as a pregnant woman (cameo)
Mayumi Tanaka as Murakawa, and the voice of Ushiwakamaru
Miki Narahashi as the voice of Annie
Mitsuaki Madono as the voice of Kick Jaguar
Miyuki Sawashiro as Chikako Shiramoto (based on Kazuko Sugiyama)
Sakura Ando as the narrator of Sora, the Prairie Girl
Yōko Asaji as Masako Sugiyama
Yo Oizumi (TEAM-NACS) as Hiroshi Matsutake (cameo)

References

External links
  
 

2019 Japanese television series debuts
2019 Japanese television series endings
Asadora